The 1978–79 Boston Celtics season was the 33rd season of the Boston Celtics in the National Basketball Association (NBA). It was the worst record of any Celtics team that played between 1950 and 1996.

Prior to the season, owner Irv Levin swapped franchises with the Buffalo Braves ownership group led by John Y. Brown, Jr.  Levin had wanted to have a team in his native California, but knew the other league owners would not consider a move of the Celtics.  He therefore brokered a deal with Brown to swap franchises, and then moved the Braves to San Diego to become the Clippers.  In the meantime, a deal was brokered, without consulting team president Red Auerbach, to trade three players (Freeman Williams, Kevin Kunnert and Kermit Washington) to the Braves for Tiny Archibald, Billy Knight and Marvin Barnes.  The move created a media firestorm for the team, as Kunnert and Washington were viewed as keys to future improvement, and Auerbach publicly stated that he was not consulted about the move.  Brown would then trade three first-round draft picks for former Brave Bob McAdoo.  Auerbach again was not consulted, and he almost took a job with the rival New York Knicks because of it.  By the start of the season, between trades and the retirement of team captain John Havlicek, only six players remained from the 1977–78 team, including the starting front three of Dave Cowens, Cedric Maxwell and Curtis Rowe, shooting guard Jo Jo White and backup point guards Don Chaney and Kevin Stacom.  Team depth issues were worsened when first round draft pick Larry Bird decided to remain in college for the season.

Following the season, Brown would sell his portion of the team to partner Harry T. Mangurian, Jr. Brown would subsequently be elected Governor of his native Kentucky later that year.

Draft picks

Roster

Regular season

Season standings

Record vs. opponents

References

Boston Celtics seasons
Boston Celtics
Boston Celtics
Boston Celtics
Celtics
Celtics